The 1968 Australian One and a Half Litre Championship was a CAMS sanctioned motor racing title for drivers of Australian 1½ Litre Formula racing cars. It was the fifth and final Australian One and a Half Litre Championship to be awarded prior to the demise of the formula at the end of 1968.

Calendar
The title was contested over a six heat series,  run concurrently with the 1968 Australian Drivers' Championship. 
 Heat 1, Bathurst Gold Star Trophy, Mount Panorama, Bathurst, New South Wales, 15 April
 Heat 2, Governor's Trophy, Lakeside, Queensland, 28 July
 Heat 3, Rothman's Trophy, Surfers Paradise, Queensland, 24 August
 Heat 4, Lombard (Aust.) Victoria Trophy, Sandown Park, Victoria, 15 September
 Heat 5, Advertiser Trophy, Mallala, South Australia, 14 October
 Heat 6, Hordern Trophy, Warwick Farm, New South Wales, 1 December

Points system
Championship points were awarded on a 9-6-4-3-2-1 basis to the drivers of the six best placed Australian 1½ Litre Formula cars at each heat. The best five results from the six heats could be retained by each driver.

Results

References

External links
 1968 Gold Star race results Retrieved from members.optusnet.com.au on 27 October 2009
 Joint champion Max Stewart in action at the Bathurst heat Retrieved from www.autopics.com.au on 27 October 2009

Australian One and a Half Litre Championship
One and a Half Litre Championship